Wei Yu-jen (born 14 January 1994) is a Taiwanese football player who plays as a midfielder.

International goals

U23

References

External links 
 

1994 births
Living people
Taiwanese footballers
Chinese Taipei international footballers
Association football midfielders